Abacetus gimmanus is a species of ground beetle in the subfamily Pterostichinae. It was described by Straneo in 1979.

References

gimmanus
Beetles described in 1979